The Journal of Formalized Reasoning is a peer-reviewed open access academic journal established in 2009. It publishes formalization efforts in any area, including classical mathematics, constructive mathematics, formal algorithms, and program verifications. It is maintained by AlmaDL, the digital library of the University of Bologna.

Abstracting and indexing 
The journal is abstracted and indexed in Scopus, MathSciNet, and Zentralblatt MATH.

External links
 

Computer science journals
Open access journals
Reasoning
Publications established in 2008
Biannual journals
University of Bologna
English-language journals